Darren Young (born 28 February 1981) is a New Zealand football defender, A retired footballer, former clubs included Barnsley, Football Kingz, Waterford United and Athlone Town Irish club Athlone Town. He has represented New Zealand at under-20 level.

References

New Zealand association footballers
New Zealand expatriate association footballers
Football Kingz F.C. players
1981 births
Living people
Waitakere City FC players
Mervue United A.F.C. players
League of Ireland players
Association football defenders